Olu Omoluyiri was the 9th Olu of the medieval Nigerian Warri kingdom who ruled over the Itsekiri and non Itsekiri people in the kingdom.  He was the brother to Olu Oyenakpagha (Olu Obanighenren), the 8th Olu of Warri Kingdom and the son to Olu Atuwatse I (Olu Dom Domingos), the 7th Olu of Warri. He succeeded his brother, Olu Oyenakpagha (Olu Obanighenren) as the 9th Olu of Warri. His Portuguese name was Mathias Ludivico. He was succeeded by his son Olu Abejoye.

References

Nigerian traditional rulers
People from Warri
Year of birth unknown
Year of death unknown